Patrick O'Kerry (some sources Patrick O’Korry)  was appointed Dean of Armagh in 1362  and was still living in 1370.

References

Deans of Armagh
14th-century Irish Roman Catholic priests